Spur gears or straight-cut gears are the simplest type of gear. They consist of a cylinder or disk with teeth projecting radially. Viewing the gear at 90 degrees from the shaft length (side on) the tooth faces are straight and aligned parallel to the axis of rotation. Looking down the length of the shaft, a tooth's cross section is usually not triangular.  Instead of being straight (as in a triangle) the sides of the cross section have a curved form (usually involute and less commonly cycloidal) to achieve a constant drive ratio. Spur gears mesh together correctly only if fitted to parallel shafts.  No axial thrust is created by the tooth loads. Spur gears are excellent at moderate speeds but tend to be noisy at high speeds.

Spur gear can be classified into two pressure angles, 20° being the current industry standard and 14½° being the former (often found in older equipment). Spur gear teeth are manufactured as either involute profile or cycloidal profile.  When two gears are in mesh it is possible that an involute portion of one will contact a non-involute portion of the other gear. This phenomenon is known as "interference" and occurs when the number of teeth on the smaller of the two meshing gears is less than a required minimum. Undercutting (cutting the tooth narrower closer to its base) is sometimes used to avoid interference but is usually not suitable because the decreased thickness leaves the tooth weaker at its base. In this situation, corrected gears are used. In corrected gears the cutter rack is shifted upwards or downwards.

Spur gears can be classified into two main categories: External and Internal. Gears with teeth on the outside of the cylinder are known as "external gears". Gears with teeth on the internal side of the cylinder are known as "internal gears". An external gear can mesh with an external gear or an internal gear. When two external gears mesh together they rotate in the opposite directions. An internal gear can only mesh with an external gear and the gears rotate in the same direction. Due to the close positioning of shafts, internal gear assemblies are more compact than external gear assemblies.

PCD and MOD

In the case of Module (MOD) 4.0 spur gears:
 Normal spur gears (over 17 teeth) have a pitch circle diameter (PCD) equal to MOD × number of teeth. 
 Corrected spur gears (under 17 teeth) have a PCD equal to MOD × number of teeth + MOD.

There are two types of corrected gears:
S0 gearing (x1 + x2 = zero)
S  gearing (x1 + x2 ≠ zero)

References

Gears